Parnac may refer to the following places in France:

 Parnac, Indre, a commune in the Indre department
 Parnac, Lot, a commune in the Lot department